The following lists events that happened during 1945 in Australia.

Incumbents

Monarch – George VI
Governor-General – Alexander Hore-Ruthven, 1st Baron Gowrie (until 30 January), then the Duke of Gloucester
Prime Minister – John Curtin (died in office 5 July), then Frank Forde (until 13 July), then Ben Chifley
Chief Justice – Sir John Latham

State Premiers
Premier of New South Wales – William McKell
Premier of Queensland – Frank Cooper
Premier of South Australia – Thomas Playford IV
Premier of Tasmania – Robert Cosgrove
Premier of Victoria – Albert Dunstan (until 2 October), then Ian MacFarlan (until 21 November), then John Cain
Premier of Western Australia – John Willcock (until 31 July), then Frank Wise

State Governors
Governor of New South Wales – John Loder, 2nd Baron Wakehurst (until 6 June)
Governor of Queensland – Sir Leslie Orme Wilson
Governor of South Australia – Sir Charles Norrie
Governor of Tasmania – Sir Ernest Clark (until 4 August), then Sir Hugh Binney (from 24 December)
Governor of Victoria – Sir Winston Dugan
Governor of Western Australia – none appointed

Events
30 January — Prince Henry, Duke of Gloucester becomes Australia's first royal Governor-General.
31 January — A Stinson aircraft crashes in Victoria, killing all 10 on board.
9 May — Germany surrenders to the Allies, ending World War II in Europe.
26 June — Dr H. V. Evatt signs the United Nations Charter on behalf of Australia.
8 to 30 June — Perth receives  of rain in twenty-three days, easily its heaviest monthly rainfall on record and unlikely to be approached due to anthropogenic global warming.
5 July — Prime Minister John Curtin dies in office from heart problems at The Lodge in Canberra.
6 July — Frank Forde is sworn in as Prime Minister of Australia, following the death of John Curtin. He will serve Australia's shortest term as Prime Minister, being replaced by Ben Chifley a week later.
7 July — The Australian 7th Division commences operations in the Battle of Balikpapan. Operations are completed by 21 July.
13 July — Ben Chifley is elected as leader of the Australian Labor Party, becoming the 16th Prime Minister of Australia.
15 August — Japan surrenders to the Allies, ending World War II. The day is known as V-P Day (Victory in the Pacific).
10 November — A general election is held in Victoria.

Science and technology
12 December – Howard Florey shares the Nobel Prize in Physiology or Medicine for his work on penicillin.

Arts and literature

 June – Ern Malley hoax
 William Dargie wins the Archibald Prize with his portrait of Edmund Herring
 Russell Drysdale paints The Drover's Wife

Film
1 May – The Australian National Film Board is established.

Sport
 1 September – Eastern Suburbs defeats Balmain 22–18 in the final of the 1945 New South Wales Rugby Football League season. South Sydney  finish in last place, claiming the wooden spoon.
 29 September – The 1945 VFL Grand Final is held, and becomes known as the "Bloodbath" due to the wet, muddy conditions and frequent violence between players and amongst the spectators. Carlton defeats South Melbourne 15.13 (103) to 10.15 (75).
 6 November – Rainbird wins the Melbourne Cup.
 26 December – The first Sydney to Hobart Yacht Race begins. The British yacht Rani wins both line honours and the handicap, arriving in Hobart on 3 January.

Births
 1 January – Peter Duncan, politician
 2 January
 Diane Fahey, poet
 Byron Barnard Lamont, botanist
 8 January – Jeannie Lewis, musician
 10 January – John Fahey, 38th Premier of New South Wales (1992–1995) (died 2020)
 15 January – John Peard, rugby league player and coach
 19 January – Judith Clingan, composer and musician
 22 January – Arthur Beetson, rugby league player and coach (died 2011)
 22 January – Ken Ticehurst, politician
 26 January – John Coates, mathematician (died 2022)
 28 January – Peter Cochran, politician
 11 February
 Ralph Doubell, Olympic athlete
 Peter Blackmore, politician
 23 February – Robert Gray, poet
 26 February – Peter Brock, racing driver (died 2006)
 3 March – George Miller, film director and producer
 16 March – Michael Cobb, politician
 10 April – Kevin Berry, butterfly swimmer (died 2006)
 13 April – Judy Nunn, actress, author
 8 May – Janine Haines, politician (died 2004)
 17 May – Tony Roche, tennis player
 22 May – Bob Katter, politician
 27 May – George Thompson, politician
 29 May – Chris Barrie, Chief of the Defence Force
 1 June – Kerry Vincent, chef and author (died 2021)
 2 June – Michael Leunig, cartoonist
 10 June – Martin Wesley-Smith, composer (died 2019)
 5 July – Johnny Famechon, boxer (died 2022)
 13 July – Ashley Mallett, cricketer (died 2021)
 17 July – Athena Starwoman, astrologer (died 2004)
 18 July – Max Tolson, soccer player
 21 July – Geoff Dymock, cricketer
 1 August – Ken Aldred, politician (died 2016)
 2 August – Alex Jesaulenko, Australian rules football player
 6 August – Tony Dell, cricketer 
 7 August
 Graeme Blundell, actor
 Graham Ramshaw, Australian rules football player (died 2006)
 12 August – Mal Washer, politician
 18 August – Gillian Bouras, writer
 23 August – Ian McManus, politician
 27 August – Kerry O'Brien, television journalist
 22 October – Clover Moore, politician, 82nd Lord Mayor of the City of Sydney (2004–present)
 25 October – Peter Ledger, illustrator (died 1994)
 26 October – John Romeril, playwright
 1 November – John Williamson, singer
 15 November – Roger Donaldson, New Zealand film director
 19 November – Barry Haase, politician
 26 November – Roger Price, politician
 28 November – John Hargreaves, actor (died 1996)
 5 December – Joanne Burns, poet
 7 December – Bob Martin, politician
 15 December – Thaao Penghlis, actor
 22 December – Sam Newman, Australian rules football player and media personality
 31 December – Vernon Wells, actor

Deaths
 28 January – Samuel Dennis, Victorian politician (b. 1870)
 4 March – Sir Harry Chauvel, 11th Chief of the General Staff (b. 1865)
 5 March – Rupert Downes, soldier (b. 1885)
 6 April – Paddy Stokes, New South Wales politician (b. 1884)
 15 April – Thomas Collins, New South Wales politician (b. 1884)
 1 June – Walter Frederick Gale, banker and astronomer (b. 1865)
 5 June – Albert Piddington, New South Wales politician and High Court judge (b. 1862)
 5 July – John Curtin, Prime Minister of Australia (b. 1885)
 10 July – Jack Moses, bush poet (b. 1861)
 11 July – Frank Hill, New South Wales politician (b. 1883)
 29 July – Henry Burrell, naturalist (b. 1873)
 5 August – Alfred Reid, New South Wales politician (b. 1867)
 20 August – Sir Macpherson Robertson, confectioner (b. 1859)
 6 September – David Hall, New South Wales politician and barrister (b. 1874)
 15 September – William Calman Grahame, New South Wales politician (b. 1863)
 15 October – Tom Swiney, New South Wales politician (b. 1875)
 12 November – Reginald Weaver, New South Wales politician (b. 1876)
 6 December – Sir Edmund Dwyer-Gray, Premier of Tasmania (b. 1870)

See also
 List of Australian films of the 1940s

References

 
Australia
Years of the 20th century in Australia